Death of An Indie Label is a documentary & soundtrack about the independent record label Reel Life Productions, founded by James H. Smith and his younger brother, rapper Esham, in Detroit in 1990. The film, which was uploaded onto the label's YouTube channel, features appearances by James Smith, Esham and Mastamind. The soundtrack for the film features Seven the General and Poe Whosaine.

Summary 
James Smith and his younger brother, Esham, a rapper, found the independent record label Reel Life Productions in 1988. In 1989, Esham records his debut album, Boomin' Words from Hell in one day. In 1992, Esham founds a group, Natas, who release their debut album, Life After Death on Reel Life. Natas and Reel Life Productions are the subject of much controversy when a 17-year-old fan killed himself while smoking cannabis and playing Russian roulette while listening to Life After Death. Esham goes on to influence local artists Kid Rock, Eminem and Insane Clown Posse. James Smith, the CEO of Reel Life Productions, is diagnosed with schizophrenia following a prison sentence. Smith's deteriorating mental state is depicted. Due to the poor living conditions of his apartment, James is evicted by his landlady, and moves in with Esham.

Reception 
The Metro Times describes the film as "compelling viewing".

Soundtrack 

Death of an Indie Label is the third mixtape by Esham. Released in 2011, it is the soundtrack to the documentary film of the same name and features Detroit emcees "Poe Whosaine" & Seven the General

References

External links 
 
 

2011 films
2011 soundtrack albums
Albums produced by Esham
American documentary films
Esham albums
Documentary films about hip hop music and musicians
Hip hop soundtracks
2011 mixtape albums
Reel Life Productions compilation albums
2011 documentary films
Internet documentary films
2011 YouTube videos
2010s English-language films
2010s American films